Hans Lichtenstern (born 4 October 1948) is a German speed skater. He competed in the men's 500 metres event at the 1972 Winter Olympics.

References

1948 births
Living people
German male speed skaters
Olympic speed skaters of West Germany
Speed skaters at the 1972 Winter Olympics
Sportspeople from Munich